Évin-Malmaison is a commune in the Pas-de-Calais department in the Hauts-de-France region of France.

Geography
The canalised river Deûle forms the south-western boundary of the commune.

Population

Places of interest

 The church of St.Vaast, dating from the sixteenth century.
 The war memorial.
 Remains of an 18th-century priory.

See also
Communes of the Pas-de-Calais department

References

External links

 Official commune website 

Evinmalmaison
Artois